2016 LNB All-Star Game was the French All-Star Game event of the LNB Pro A as a part of the 2016–17 Pro A season. The event took place on 29 December 2016 and the game was played at the AccorHotels Arena in Paris. The Foreign Team won the game 129–130 and John Roberson of Élan Chalon was named All-Star Game MVP.

All-Star Game

Game

References

 
Basketball all-star games